Van Geen is a surname. Notable people with the surname include:

 Alexander van Geen (1903–1942), Dutch modern pentathlete
 John van Geen (1929–2000), Dutch researcher

See also
 Geen
 Van Veen

Dutch-language surnames
Surnames of Dutch origin